Romulus Silvius (said to have reigned 873-854 BC) was a descendant of Aeneas and a king of Alba Longa. Alba Longa was a city near the site of Rome, founded later by Romulus, his great-great-great-grandson in 753 BC. He was also known as Aremulus or Alladius. Romulus Silvius is said to have been a wicked ruler and pretended to know how to make thunder in order to frighten his subjects into worshiping him as a god. He perished in a thunderstorm with excessive rain.

Family tree

See also
 List of the descendants of Aeneas

Notes

Kings of Alba Longa